Jarious K. Jackson (born May 3, 1977) is a professional Canadian football pass game coordinator and quarterbacks coach for the Edmonton Elks of the Canadian Football League (CFL). He has also been a coach for the Toronto Argonauts, Saskatchewan Roughriders, and BC Lions. Jackson played professionally in the CFL for eight seasons with the Lions and one year with the Argonauts where he won three Grey Cup championships in 2006, 2011, and 2012. He has also been a member of the Denver Broncos (NFL), to whom he was drafted 214th overall in the 2000 NFL Draft, and the Barcelona Dragons (NFL Europe). Jackson played college football for the Notre Dame Fighting Irish.

High school
Jackson attended Tupelo High School in Tupelo, Mississippi, and was a letterman in football, basketball, and track. In football, he won SuperPrep All-America honors.

College career
Jackson attended the University of Notre Dame, where he was a two-year starter and set school single-season records for passing yards (2,753), completions (184), and attempts (316) as a senior during the 1999 season.  In the process, he broke the yardage mark held by the legendary Joe Theismann.  (All of Jackson's records were subsequently broken by Brady Quinn.)  Jackson also threw for 17 touchdowns during his senior year, ranking third behind Ron Powlus and Rick Mirer. He was second on the team in rushing with 140 carries for 464 yards (3.3 avg) and 7 scores.

Professional career

Denver Broncos
Jackson was drafted in the seventh round of the 2000 NFL Draft, 214th overall, by the Denver Broncos. Pro scouts projected that Jackson could develop into a solid NFL quarterback if placed into the right system.  However, after four seasons as a Bronco backup, he saw action in only five games, completing 11 of 22 passes for 114 yards.

Barcelona Dragons
Jackson also spent one season (2001) in Barcelona, as part of NFL Europe, where he competed in the 2001 World Bowl.

BC Lions
In 2004, Jackson signed onto the practice squad of the BC Lions in the CFL.  He began 2005 on the practice squad, but was elevated to the active roster when CFL superstars Dave Dickenson and Casey Printers went down with injuries.  He saw action in 2 games, had 3 completions out of 6 attempts for a total of 30 yards and rushed four times for a total of 35 yards.

At the beginning of 2006 season, Jackson began as the third-string quarterback, behind Dickenson and Buck Pierce.  However, with alternating injuries to Dickenson and Pierce, he made appearances in all but the final regular season game. 2007 proved, however, to be Jackson's break-out season as he became starting quarterback when Dickenson and Pierce were both out with injuries. For the 11 games Jackson was starting, he had a record of 9–2, threw for 2,553 yards, 18 TDs on 167 completions and 10 interceptions. On February 4, 2008, Jackson re-signed with the Lions 12 days before qualifying as a free-agent. At the beginning of the 2008 season, he was the back-up to Buck Pierce, but has started some games. His only pass in the Western semi-final was a touchdown toss to Geroy Simon.

He was released by the Lions on February 1, 2012.

Toronto Argonauts
On February 22, 2012, it was announced that Jackson had signed a two-year contract with the Toronto Argonauts. He dressed in all 18 games, starting in four, and was a member of the 100th Grey Cup winning team while throwing a touchdown pass in that game. On February 4, 2013, he was released by the Toronto Argonauts.

Shortly after his release from the Argonauts, it was announced that Jackson would sign a one-day contract with the BC Lions so that he could retire as a Lion.

Coaching career
Immediately upon retiring it was announced that Jackson would then begin his coaching career as the quarterbacks coach for the Lions. After coaching in BC for one year (2013) he spent the next couple seasons as the quarterbacks coach for both the Edmonton Eskimos and Saskatchewan Roughriders before being named the BC Lions' Offensive Coordinator for the 2018 season. He retained the position for the 2019 BC Lions season, but after a disappointing year, his contract was not renewed for 2020.

On February 6, 2020, it was announced that Jackson was joining the Toronto Argonauts as the team's offensive coordinator and quarterbacks coach. The 2020 CFL season was cancelled, but Jackson coached for the Argonauts in 2021 where the team finished in first place in the East Division.

On January 4, 2022, Jackson formally joined the Edmonton Elks as the team's pass game coordinator and quarterbacks coach.

Statistics

Notes

External links
BC Lions Profile

1977 births
Living people
African-American players of American football
African-American players of Canadian football
American football quarterbacks
American players of Canadian football
Barcelona Dragons players
BC Lions players
Canadian football quarterbacks
Denver Broncos players
Edmonton Elks coaches
Notre Dame Fighting Irish football players
Sportspeople from Tupelo, Mississippi
Players of American football from Mississippi
Toronto Argonauts players
BC Lions coaches
Saskatchewan Roughriders coaches
Toronto Argonauts coaches
Tupelo High School alumni
21st-century African-American sportspeople
20th-century African-American sportspeople